Thomas Bayes (/beɪz/; c. 1701 – 1761) was an English statistician, philosopher, and Presbyterian minister.

Bayesian refers either to a range of concepts and approaches that relate to statistical methods based on Bayes' theorem, or a follower of these methods.

A number of things have been named after Thomas Bayes, including:

Bayes 
Bayes action
Bayes Business School
Bayes classifier
Bayes discriminability index
Bayes error rate
Bayes estimator
Bayes factor
Bayes Impact
Bayes linear statistics
Bayes prior
 Bayes' theorem / Bayes-Price theorem -- sometimes called Bayes' rule or Bayesian updating.
Empirical Bayes method
Evidence under Bayes theorem
Hierarchical Bayes model
Laplace–Bayes estimator
Naive Bayes classifier
Random naive Bayes

Bayesian 

Approximate Bayesian computation
Bayesian average
Bayesian Analysis (journal)
Bayesian approaches to brain function
 Bayesian bootstrap
Bayesian control rule
Bayesian cognitive science
Bayesian econometrics
Bayesian efficiency
Bayesian epistemology
Bayesian expected loss
Bayesian experimental design
Bayesian game
Bayesian hierarchical modeling
Bayesian History Matching
Bayesian inference
Bayesian inference in phylogeny
Bayesian information criterion (BIC) and
Widely applicable Bayesian information criterion (WBIC)
Bayesian Kepler periodogram
Bayesian Knowledge Tracing
Bayesian learning mechanisms
Bayesian linear regression
Bayesian model of computational anatomy
Bayesian model averaging (BMA)
Bayesian model combination (BMC)
Bayesian model reduction
Bayesian model selection
Bayesian multivariate linear regression
Bayesian Nash equilibrium
Bayesian network
Bayesian neural network
Bayesian operational modal analysis (BAYOMA)
Bayesian-optimal mechanism
Bayesian-optimal pricing
Bayesian optimization
Bayesian poisoning
Bayesian probability
Bayesian procedures
Bayesian programming
Bayesian program synthesis
Bayesian quadrature
Bayesian regret
Bayesian search theory
Bayesian spam filtering
Bayesian statistics
Bayesian structural time series
 Bayesian support-vector machine
Bayesian survival analysis
Bayesian template estimation
Bayesian tool for methylation analysis
Bayesian vector autoregression
Dynamic Bayesian network
International Society for Bayesian Analysis
Perfect Bayesian equilibrium (PBE)
Quantum Bayesianism
Recursive Bayesian estimation
Robust Bayesian analysis
Variable-order Bayesian network
Variational Bayesian methods

See also 
Banburismus, a cryptanalytic process 
Bayesian approaches to brain function
Bayesian inference in marketing
Bayesian inference in motor learning
Bayesian inference using Gibbs sampling (BUGS)
Bayesian interpretation of kernel regularization
Bayesian tool for methylation analysis (BATMAN)
Conditional Probability
Credibility theory
Evidence under Bayes' theorem
Dempster–Shafer theory, a generalization of Bayes' theorem.
History of Bayesian statistics
Inverse probability
Inverse resolution
Nested sampling algorithm
Polytree
Signaling game

References

External links 
 

Bayes, Thomas